The Order of the Württemberg Crown (Orden der Württembergischen Krone) was an order of chivalry in Württemberg.

History
First established in 1702 as the St.-Hubertus-Jagdorden (Order of St Hubert), in 1807 it was renamed the "Ritterorden vom Goldenen Adler" (Order of the Golden Eagle) by Frederick I, and on 23 September 1818 renewed and restructured (at the same time as the civil orders) by William I as the "Order of the Württemberg Crown" with (initially) 3 classes (grand cross, komtur, knight). In 1918 the order was expanded and changed.

Its motto reads : Furchtlos und treu (fearless and loyal). Until 1913 the higher orders were restricted to the nobility. In descending order, its ranks were:
 Grand cross for sovereigns
 Grand cross
 Commander with star (since 1889)
 Commander
 Honour cross (Ehrenkreuz; Steckkreuz since 1892)
 Knight (since 1892 with golden lions, and since 1864 also with a crown, as a special honour)
 Gold service medal (Verdienstmedaille)
 Silver service medal (Verdienstmedaille, abolished 1892)

Insignia

Cross
The order's cross was a white enameled Maltese cross with gold lions in its four angles. The lions came as standard for the grand cross and Komtur, but were only on knight's crosses as a special honour. On the upper arm, a golden crown was secured by means of two gold bands, from which – except in the honour cross in stuck form – the cross hung. The medallion was gold and blue on the front, and in the middle were the golden initials of king Frederick I and a crown – on the back was a golden crown, on red. All grades could since 1866 be awarded with swords. With the changes of 1890, the swords were only granted in awards of a higher class. Since 1892 the lowest grades (1870–1886 knight 2nd class, after that honour-cross) also had the special honours of golden lion and (since 1864) lion added.

Stars
The grand-cross was a silver 8-pointed star in whose middle was a reduced cross in a medallion with a circular motto in the centre. Sovereigns received the star in gold. The Komtur (since 1889 no longer of the Komtur with star) had a 4-pointed silver star whose rays went through the cross angles.

Ribbon
The ribbon was carmine red with black stripes and carmine borders. Members of reigning houses received insignia of the grand-cross with a ribbon in scarlet.

Awards
Many awards were made – in the First World War alone, the numbers were:

Gold Verdienstmedaille: 141
Knight cross with swords: insgesamt ca. 350
Knight cross with swords and lions: 80
Ehrenkreuz with swords: ca. 160
Komtur with swords: 75
Komtur with star and swords: 6
Grand cross with swords: 6

As an extraordinary instance, the grand-cross "in Brillanten" was granted to Reichskanzler Otto von Bismarck in 1871.

 Grand Crosses
 Prince Adalbert of Prussia (1811–1873)
 Prince Adalbert of Prussia (1884–1948)
 Duke Adam of Württemberg
 Adolf I, Prince of Schaumburg-Lippe
 Duke Adolf Friedrich of Mecklenburg
 Prince Adolf of Schaumburg-Lippe
 Adolphe, Grand Duke of Luxembourg
 Adolphus Frederick V, Grand Duke of Mecklenburg-Strelitz
 Albert I, Prince of Monaco
 Prince Albert of Prussia (1809–1872)
 Albert of Saxony
 Prince Albert of Saxony (1875–1900)
 Archduke Albrecht, Duke of Teschen
 Albert, Prince Consort
 Prince Albert of Prussia (1837–1906)
 Albrecht, Duke of Württemberg
 Alexander II of Russia
 Alexander III of Russia
 Alexander Frederick, Landgrave of Hesse
 Alexander of Battenberg
 Prince Alexander of Hesse and by Rhine
 Duke Alexander of Oldenburg
 Duke Alexander of Württemberg (1771–1833)
 Duke Alexander of Württemberg (1804–1881)
 Duke Alexander of Württemberg (1804–1885)
 Alexander, Prince of Orange
 Grand Duke Alexei Alexandrovich of Russia
 Alexis, Prince of Bentheim and Steinfurt
 Alfonso XIII
 Alfred, Duke of Saxe-Coburg and Gotha
 Alfred, 2nd Prince of Montenuovo
 Prince Arnulf of Bavaria
 Alexander Cambridge, 1st Earl of Athlone
 Prince August of Württemberg
 August, Prince of Hohenlohe-Öhringen
 Maximilian de Beauharnais, 3rd Duke of Leuchtenberg
 Prince Bernhard of Saxe-Weimar-Eisenach (1792–1862)
 Theobald von Bethmann Hollweg
 Friedrich Ferdinand von Beust
 Hans Alexis von Biehler
 Friedrich Wilhelm von Bismarck
 Herbert von Bismarck
 Otto von Bismarck
 Leonhard Graf von Blumenthal
 Jérôme Bonaparte
 Jérôme Napoléon Bonaparte
 Felix Graf von Bothmer
 Paul Bronsart von Schellendorff
 Walther Bronsart von Schellendorff
 Bernhard von Bülow
 Count Karl Ferdinand von Buol
 Adolphus Cambridge, 1st Marquess of Cambridge
 Leo von Caprivi
 Carl, Duke of Württemberg
 Carol I of Romania
 Jean-Baptiste de Nompère de Champagny
 Charles I of Württemberg
 Charles Augustus, Hereditary Grand Duke of Saxe-Weimar-Eisenach (1844–1894)
 Prince Charles of Prussia
 Archduke Charles Stephen of Austria
 Chlodwig, Prince of Hohenlohe-Schillingsfürst
 Christian IX of Denmark
 Constantine I of Greece
 Constantine, Prince of Hohenzollern-Hechingen
 Duke Constantine Petrovich of Oldenburg
 Diane, Duchess of Württemberg
 Grand Duke Dmitry Konstantinovich of Russia
 Eduard, Duke of Anhalt
 Edward VII
 Prince Edward of Saxe-Weimar
 Prince Eitel Friedrich of Prussia
 Ernest II, Duke of Saxe-Coburg and Gotha
 Ernest Louis, Grand Duke of Hesse
 Ernst I, Prince of Hohenlohe-Langenburg
 Ernst I, Duke of Saxe-Altenburg
 Ernst II, Prince of Hohenlohe-Langenburg
 Ernst Gunther, Duke of Schleswig-Holstein
 Ernst II, Duke of Saxe-Altenburg
 Ernst Leopold, 4th Prince of Leiningen
 Max von Fabeck
 Géza Fejérváry
 Ferdinand IV, Grand Duke of Tuscany
 Archduke Ferdinand Karl of Austria
 Francis II of the Two Sicilies
 Francisco de Asís, Duke of Cádiz
 Frederic von Franquemont
 Archduke Franz Ferdinand of Austria
 Franz Joseph I of Austria
 Archduke Franz Karl of Austria
 Prince Franz of Bavaria
 Frederick Augustus II, Grand Duke of Oldenburg
 Frederick Augustus III of Saxony
 Frederick Francis II, Grand Duke of Mecklenburg-Schwerin
 Frederick Francis III, Grand Duke of Mecklenburg-Schwerin
 Frederick I, Duke of Anhalt
 Frederick I, Grand Duke of Baden
 Frederick III, German Emperor
 Prince Frederick of Württemberg
 Prince Frederick of the Netherlands
 Friedrich II, Duke of Anhalt
 Friedrich Ferdinand, Duke of Schleswig-Holstein
 Friedrich Hermann Otto, Prince of Hohenzollern-Hechingen
 Prince Friedrich Leopold of Prussia
 Archduke Friedrich, Duke of Teschen
 Charles Egon II, Prince of Fürstenberg
 Maximilian Egon II, Prince of Fürstenberg
 Georg II, Duke of Saxe-Meiningen
 George I of Greece
 George V of Hanover
 George V
 George, King of Saxony
 George Victor, Prince of Waldeck and Pyrmont
 Friedrich von Georgi
 Friedrich von Gerok (officer)
 Heinrich von Gossler
 Gustaf V
 Wilhelm von Hahnke
 Max von Hausen
 Samu Hazai
 Heinrich XXVII, Prince Reuss Younger Line
 Prince Henry of Prussia (1862–1929)
 Heinrich VII, Prince Reuss of Köstritz
 Prince Henry of the Netherlands (1820–1879)
 Hermann, Prince of Hohenlohe-Langenburg
 Prince Hermann of Saxe-Weimar-Eisenach (1825–1901)
 Philip, Landgrave of Hesse-Homburg
 Paul von Hindenburg
 Prince Konrad of Hohenlohe-Schillingsfürst
 Henning von Holtzendorff
 Dietrich von Hülsen-Haeseler
 Prince Joachim of Prussia
 Prince Johann Georg of Saxony
 John of Saxony
 Duke John Albert of Mecklenburg
 Archduke Joseph Karl of Austria
 Joseph, Duke of Saxe-Altenburg
 Georg von Kameke
 Karl Anton, Prince of Hohenzollern
 Prince Karl of Bavaria (1874–1927)
 Prince Karl Theodor of Bavaria
 Karl Theodor, Duke in Bavaria
 Karl, Prince of Hohenzollern-Sigmaringen
 Hans von Koester
 Grand Duke Konstantin Konstantinovich of Russia
 Grand Duke Konstantin Nikolayevich of Russia
 Konstantin of Hohenlohe-Schillingsfürst
 Hermann Kövess von Kövessháza
 Leopold II of Belgium
 Archduke Leopold Ferdinand of Austria
 Prince Leopold, Duke of Albany
 Prince Leopold of Bavaria
 Eugen Maximilianovich, 5th Duke of Leuchtenberg
 George Maximilianovich, 6th Duke of Leuchtenberg
 Louis III, Grand Duke of Hesse
 Louis II, Grand Duke of Baden
 Prince Louis of Battenberg
 Ludwig I of Bavaria
 Ludwig III of Bavaria
 Archduke Ludwig Viktor of Austria
 Luís I of Portugal
 Luitpold, Prince Regent of Bavaria
 Maximilian Karl, 6th Prince of Thurn and Taxis
 Prince Maximilian of Baden
 Julius von Mayer
 Emperor Meiji
 Grand Duke Michael Nikolaevich of Russia
 Milan I of Serbia
 Helmuth von Moltke the Elder
 Georg Alexander von Müller
 Napoleon III
 Duke Nicholas of Württemberg
 Nicholas I of Russia
 Nicholas II of Russia
 Nicholas Alexandrovich, Tsesarevich of Russia
 Grand Duke Nicholas Nikolaevich of Russia (1831–1891)
 Grand Duke Nicholas Nikolaevich of Russia (1856–1929)
 Prince Nikolaus Wilhelm of Nassau
 Alexey Fyodorovich Orlov
 Oscar II
 Archduke Otto of Austria (1865–1906)
 Prince Paul of Württemberg
 Duke Paul Wilhelm of Württemberg
 Peter II, Grand Duke of Oldenburg
 Duke Peter of Oldenburg
 Philipp Albrecht, Duke of Württemberg
 Duke Philipp of Württemberg
 Prince Philippe, Count of Flanders
 Hans von Plessen
 Moritz Karl Ernst von Prittwitz
 Joseph Radetzky von Radetz
 Antoni Wilhelm Radziwiłł
 Archduke Rainer Ferdinand of Austria
 Duke Robert of Württemberg
 Albrecht von Roon
 Prince Rudolf of Liechtenstein
 Rudolf, Crown Prince of Austria
 Rupprecht, Crown Prince of Bavaria
 Prince William of Schaumburg-Lippe
 Sigismund von Schlichting
 Alfred von Schlieffen
 Ludwig von Schröder
 Grand Duke Sergei Alexandrovich of Russia
 Archduke Stephen of Austria (Palatine of Hungary)
 Rudolf Stöger-Steiner von Steinstätten
 Otto Graf zu Stolberg-Wernigerode
 Ludwig Freiherr von und zu der Tann-Rathsamhausen
 Francis, Duke of Teck
 Alfred von Tirpitz
 Umberto I of Italy
 Victor Emmanuel III of Italy
 Grand Duke Vladimir Alexandrovich of Russia
 Illarion Vorontsov-Dashkov
 Alfred von Waldersee
 Karl von Weizsäcker
 August von Werder
 Wilhelm II, German Emperor
 Wilhelm Karl, Duke of Urach
 Prince Wilhelm of Prussia (1783–1851)
 Prince Wilhelm of Saxe-Weimar-Eisenach
 Wilhelm, Duke of Urach
 Prince William of Baden
 William I, German Emperor
 William II of Württemberg
 William IV
 William Ernest, Grand Duke of Saxe-Weimar-Eisenach
 Duke William Frederick Philip of Württemberg
 Prince William of Baden (1829–1897)
 Duke William of Württemberg
 William, Duke of Brunswick
 William, Prince of Hohenzollern
 William, Prince of Wied
 Duke Eugen of Württemberg (1788–1857)
 Duke Eugen of Württemberg (1820–1875)
 Duke Eugen of Württemberg (1846–1877)
 Duke Ferdinand Frederick Augustus of Württemberg
 Ferdinand von Zeppelin
 Commanders
 Erwin Bälz
 Paul von Bruns
 Victor von Bruns
 Adolf von Deines
 Karl Ludwig d'Elsa
 Christian Wilhelm von Faber du Faur
 Maximilian Vogel von Falckenstein
 Wilhelm von Gümbel
 Jakob von Hartmann
 Eberhard von Hofacker
 Johann Baptist von Keller
 Carl Friedrich Kielmeyer
 Wilhelm Frederick von Ludwig
 Karl von Luz
 August von Mackensen
 Curt von Morgen
 Christian Friedrich von Otto
 Friedrich von Payer
 Friedrich August von Quenstedt
 Rudolf von Roth
 Gustav Rümelin
 Hans von Seeckt
 Gustav von Senden-Bibran
 Christoph von Sigwart
 Bertel Thorvaldsen
 Karl Heinrich Weizsäcker
 Sir James Wylie, 1st Baronet
 Honour Crosses
 Hermann Bauer
 Paul Clemens von Baumgarten
 Alexander von Brill
 William G. S. Cadogan
 Max Eyth
 Wilhelm Groener
 Paul Grützner
 Erich von Gündell
 Carl Magnus von Hell
 Adolf Wild von Hohenborn
 Ewald von Lochow
 Robert von Ostertag
 Eduard Pfeiffer
 Edmund Pfleiderer
 Hubert von Rebeur-Paschwitz
 Walther Reinhardt
 Max von Schillings
 Kilian von Steiner
 Hermann Vöchting
 Oskar von Watter
 Knights
 Fedor von Bock
 Theodor Endres
 Alexander von Falkenhausen
 Hans von Feldmann
 Victor Franke
 Hans von Gronau
 Eduard von Kallee
 Fritz von Loßberg
 Eberhard Graf von Schmettow
 Otto von Stülpnagel
 Gold Service Medal]]
 Silver Service Medal]]
 Unclassified
 Rudolf von Brudermann
 Fevzi Çakmak
 Kurt Eberhard
 Justus Hecker
 Otto Keller (philologist)
 Otto von Moser
 Christian Wirth
 Nikola Zhekov

Bibliography
Jörg Nimmergut, Handbuch Deutsche Orden, Saarbrücken 1989, 315-320
ders., Deutsche Orden und Ehrenzeichen 1800-1945, Bd. III Sachsen - Württemberg I, München 1999, 1677–1704, 

Crown (Wurttemberg), Order of the
Orders, decorations, and medals of Württemberg
1702 establishments in the Holy Roman Empire
Awards established in 1702